Brian Howard (born 1997) is a Gaelic footballer who plays for the Raheny club and for the Dublin county team.

Playing career
2018 was the breakthrough year for Brian Howard as a senior footballer with Dublin. The Raheny clubman won an All-Star at midfield with fellow Raheny player Brian Fenton for his performances with Dublin throughout the year. He won the Leinster Senior Football Championship with Dublin against Laois at Croke Park and scored one point in Dublin's comfortable victory.

References

1997 births
Living people
Dublin inter-county Gaelic footballers
Gaelic football forwards
Raheny GAA footballers
St Fintan's High School
Sportspeople from Dublin (city)
Winners of four All-Ireland medals (Gaelic football)
People educated at St. Fintan's High School